Kʼicheʼ, Kʼicheeʼ or Quiché may refer to:
Kʼicheʼ people of Guatemala, a subgroup of the Maya 
Kʼicheʼ language, a Maya language spoken by the Kʼicheʼ people
Classical Kʼicheʼ, the 16th century form of the Kʼicheʼ language
Kʼicheʼ kingdom of Qʼumarkaj, a pre-Columbian state in the Guatemalan highlands

See also
Quiche (disambiguation)

Language and nationality disambiguation pages